Borough United were a minor Welsh football club based in Llandudno Junction who caused a shock by winning the Welsh Cup in 1963 before performing much better than anticipated in European football.

Early years
The club was formed in 1952 by a merger of two struggling neighbouring clubs Llandudno Junction (who had previously been successful in their league but had fallen into financial difficulties) and Conwy Borough. The new club represented something of a continuation for Llandudno Junction as they continued to play at their Nant-y-Coed ground and wear their maroon and white strip. They were soon established as a strong side in the Welsh League North, winning the title in 1958–59 and 1962–63. In the latter season the club also recorded their Welsh cup triumph, with victories over Rhyl, Denbigh Town, cup holders Bangor City and Hereford United setting up a final with Football League side Newport County In the two-legged final the club won 2–1 at home and drew 0–0 at Somerton Park to secure the win.

European football
As a consequence of the success the club qualified for the UEFA Cup Winners' Cup and faced Sliema Wanderers of Malta in the first round. A 0–0 draw in Malta was followed by a 2–0 success at the Racecourse Ground in Wrexham — a more suitable venue than the tiny Nant-y-Coed ground with its single stand and spartan changing rooms — to set up a tie with ŠK Slovan Bratislava of Czechoslovakia. Borough were defeated 1–0 at Wrexham before losing 3–0 in Bratislava. The results were no disgrace, as the part-timers of Borough United had played well against a club that fielded five full internationals.  Their win against Sliema Wanderers was the first time a Welsh club had won a round in a major European Competition.

The club enjoyed financial support and administration from a local businessman J.R. "Bob" Bithell, a successful haulage contractor, garage owner and builder involved in construction of buildings such as the Crosville Garage in Llandudno Junction, Vale Laundry, the Drill Hall in Conwy as well as dozens of homes.  Bithell supported the construction of the stand at the Nant-y-Coed ground, changing rooms and toilets.  He paid for much of the kit and helped players with travel costs especially when Borough played in Europe.  Bithell also had several coaches at the time (Blue Coaches of Llandudno that had formally been Royal Blue Coaches, Oswald Road Garage, Llandudno Junction) and his coaches did much of the team transportation when playing away.

Demise
The club continued as a top five side in their league until 1967 when they were evicted from their Nant-y-Coed ground by its owners, the Irish Oblates of Mary Immaculate order, and were ultimately forced to eke out an existence in the very minor Vale of Conwy League. They lasted in this competition until 1969 when they folded.

Honours

Welsh National League (North)
Champions: 1958–59, 1962–63
Runners-up: 1959–60, 1964–65
Welsh Cup – Winners: 1962—63
North Wales Coast Challenge Cup
Winners: 1962–63, 1963–64
Runners-up: 1965–66
Cookson Cup – Winners: 1962–63

External links
Full history from Welsh Football Data Archive
European and FA Cup records
 Gwyn Hughes web site

References

Sport in Conwy County Borough
Defunct football clubs in Wales
Association football clubs established in 1952
Association football clubs disestablished in 1969
1952 establishments in Wales
1969 disestablishments in Wales
Welsh League North clubs